Steve Green (born 1956) is an American Christian music singer.

Early life
Green was born in Portland, Oregon, to Charles and Jo Green, who were Baptist missionaries. He spent much of his early life in Argentina and then proceeded to attend Phoenix Christian High School along with two of his six siblings. He graduated from Phoenix Christian High School in 1974 and, at age 18,  enrolled at Grand Canyon University. His intended major was pre-law, but a professor recognized his musical talent and encouraged him to develop it.

Career
After two years at the university, Green left to travel the world with the band Truth. After his two-year stint with Truth (1976–78), Green married Marijean McCarty, a former member of Truth. They moved to Alexandria, Indiana, to sing backup for the Bill Gaither Trio. In 1980, Green joined Gary McSpadden, Lee Young and Bill Gaither to form the Gaither Vocal Band. Green sang tenor for their first two albums, The New Gaither Vocal Band and Passin' the Faith Along. In 1982, Steve and Gaither's musicians formed the Christian rock band White Heart. Green sang lead for White Heart as they recorded their debut self-titled album (which sold nearly 70,000 copies). In 1983, Steve left White Heart, feeling that his place was not in a rock band. That same year, a confrontation by his brother, Randy, led to a spiritual renewal in Green's life. He signed a solo contract with Sparrow Records, and released his self-titled debut album in 1984. In the same year, he established Steve Green Ministries. 

Green's breakout year came in 1985 with the release of He Holds the Keys, which earned him the Dove Award for Male Vocalist of the Year in the Contemporary Christian Music (CCM) category. The following year, 1986, saw the release of two recordings, For God And God Alone and a worship/hymns album titled A Mighty Fortress. In early 1988, he released an album dedicated to his parents, called Find Us Faithful. Green was involved with the Billy Graham Evangelistic Association from the mid-1980s onward. He was one of the first artists to be involved with Promise Keepers, performing at their inaugural event at Folsom Field in Boulder, Colorado, in July 1993 before 50,000 men. His song "Answer the Call" was inspired by the event, and another song, "O Men of God Arise," embodies the Promise Keeper's message. Green recorded The Mission in 1989 and We Believe in 1991. He released an album of hymns in 1992, and a more pop-style  on his 1994 album, Where Mercy Begins. 

In 2005 Green released a new album, Somewhere Between, which saw him move in a different direction, leaning more toward an art song style. The album featured fewer declarative answers than Green's past work, and instead explored questions of pain, doubt and loss that life inevitably rains down on both the just and the unjust. Green co-wrote half of the songs on the album. In 2007 Green released his last non-compilation album under the Sparrow label, Always: Songs of Worship. In 2010, Green released Love Will Find a Way, his first release through Steve Green Ministries. The album featured David Phelps on the track "God is Love". In 2012, Green released two albums, Rest in the Wonder and Christmas. Green stated, "Rest in the Wonder is a declaration of absolute trust in God, fiercely holding to what we know for certain and reverently worshiping the One whose ways are higher than our ways and whose thoughts are higher than our thoughts."

2014 saw the release of two more albums from Green: Hide the Word: Bible Songs for Kids and Hymns. Regarding his Hymns project, Green said, "In every age, the church has lifted her voice to express praise and adoration, but the church has also used singing to refute dangerous heresy and remind one another of the foundational Biblical truths."

His latest English album, Hold Fast, was released in 2018.  Of this album Green says, “I don’t think it’s like anything I’ve done.”  It features the reading of one Psalm, the singing of full portions of multiple Psalms, an organ and orchestra, and several songs written by Green himself.    

Green has been nominated for a Grammy Award four times. He has also been the Dove Award winner seven times and was inducted into the Gospel Music Hall of Fame in 2017. His website states he has sold over three million albums. His bilingual abilities have seen the release of seven Spanish CDs in the United States, including El Descanso, in 2019.

Personal life
Steve Green married Marijean in 1976. They have two children, Summer (Mark) and Josiah (Jamie-Lee), and six grandchildren.

Discography

As group member
 1977: Truth on the Road – Live Double Album Truth
 1977: Not Just a Coincidence – Truth
 1978: Departure – Truth
 1980: David T. Clydesdale Presents Imagination - Milk & Honey MH1018
 1981: The New Gaither Vocal Band – The New Gaither Vocal Band
 1982: White Heart – White Heart
 1983: Passin' the Faith Along – The New Gaither Vocal Band

Solo albums
1984: Steve Green (Sparrow Records)
1985: He Holds the Keys (Sparrow)
1986: For God and God Alone (Sparrow)
1987: A Mighty Fortress: A Celebration of Foundational Truths (choral album)
1987: Joy To the World (Christmas album)
1988: Find Us Faithful (Sparrow)
1989: The Mission (Sparrow)
1991: We Believe (Sparrow)
1992: Hymns: A Portrait of Christ (Sparrow)
1994: Where Mercy Begins (Sparrow)
1996: The Letter (Sparrow)
1996: The First Noel (Christmas album)
1998: The Faithful (Sparrow)
1999: Morning Light: Songs To Awaken the Dawn (Sparrow)
2002: Woven in Time (Sparrow)
2005: Somewhere Between (Sparrow)
2007: Always: Songs of Worship (Sparrow)
2010: Love Will Find a Way (Steve Green Ministries)
2012: Rest in the Wonder (Steve Green Ministries)
2012: Christmas (Steve Green Ministries)
2014: Hymns (Steve Green Ministries)
2018: Hold Fast (Steve Green Ministries)

Spanish albums
1987: Tienen Que Saber (Sparrow)
1990: Toma La Cruz (Sparrow)
1992: Himnos: Un Retrato De Cristo (Sparrow)
1994: ¡En Vivo! (Live album)
1994: 16 Melodías Bíblicas Para Niños (Sparrow)
2004: Yo Iré (Sparrow)
2009: Sólo En Jesús (Steve Green Ministries)
2019: El Descanso (Steve Green Ministries)

Children's projects
1990: Hide 'Em In Your Heart: Bible Memory Melodies, Vol. 1 (Sparrow)
1992: Hide 'Em In Your Heart: Bible Memory Melodies, vol. 2 (Sparrow)
1994: 16 Melodías Bíblicas Para Niños (Sparrow)
1996: The Adventures of Prayer Bear  Volume 1: Best Friends (Capitol Christian Music Group)
1997: The Adventures of Prayer Bear  Volume 2: How to Pray   (Capitol Christian Music Group)
1998: The Adventures of Prayer Bear  Volume 3: Time to Pray (Capitol Christian Music Group)
1998: Hide 'Em In Your Heart: Praise & Worship for Kids (Sparrow)
2004: The Adventures of Sir Bernard The Good Knight (Sparrow)
2014: Hide the Word: Bible Memory Melodies (Steve Green Ministries)

Compilations
1994: People Need the Lord (Sparrow)
1996: The Early Years (Sparrow)
2006: The Ultimate Collection (2-discs)
2012: People Need the Lord: Number Ones (Sparrow)
2015: 20th Century Masters - The Millennium Collection: The Best of Steve Green (Sparrow)

Appearances on other albums 
 1979: Jesus Lives...Forever! An Easter Cantata by Eugene McCammon, conducted by David T. Clydesdale
 1980: Imagination – orchestrated and written by David T. Clydesdale
 1980: Call Him Jesus: a choral celebration for Christmas by Robert J Hughes and Lani Smith 
 1981: Love Overflowing – Sandi Patty (background vocals)
 1981: Beyond Imagination – orchestrated and written by David T. Clydesdale
 1981: The Reason for the Season – various artists; duet with Sandi Patty on "No Room Today"
 1981: This Holy Child: a Christmas choral celebration – musical by Lani Smith
 1982: The Master's Music – various artists; "Spirit song", "New song" and "Pieces"
 1982: Thou Shall Call His Name...Jesus – various artists; "Shepherd's Song"
 1982: Joseph, the Carpenter – various artists; "Tiny Little Baby"
 1983: More than Wonderful – Sandi Patty (background)
 1983: On the Rock: a musical odyssey on Kingdom living based on the Sermon on the Mount – orchestrated and written by David T. Clydesdale
 1983: We are Called – Steve Fry "Praise Him In the Sanctuary (Medley)"
 1984: Vital Signs – White Heart (background vocals on "Let your First Thought Be Love" and "We Are His Hands")
 1984: Songs from the Heart – Sandi Patty (background)
 1984: The Sounds of His Love – Listen...To Christmas! - Don Marsh and Karen Dean; duet with Donna McElroy on "Ten Thousand Joys"
 1984: The Gift Goes On – Sandi Patty (background)
 1985: 25 Songs of Christmas, Vol. 2 – various artists; "O Holy Night"
 1985: Together We Will Stand – Continental Singers and various artists; "You're the Only Jesus"
 1985: Hotline – White Heart (background vocals on "Gotta Be A Believer" and "Turn the Page")
 1986: Morning Like This – Sandi Patty (background)
 1986: Jesus My Friend Unfailing – highlights from a Billy Graham Crusade; "Lift up a Song"
 1987: The Father Hath Provided – Larnelle Harris (trio with Larnelle Harris and Sandi Patty on the song Seekers of Your Heart)
 1990: Love Overflowing – Sandi Patty (background)
 1990: Carols by Candlelight – by John Randall Dennis; "Thou Who Wast Rich"
 1991: More than Wonderful – Sandi Patty (background)
 1991: Silver celebration: A Tribute to Bill & Gloria Gaither – various artists; "There's Something about That Name"
 1992: No Compromise: Remembering the Music of Keith Green – various artists; "Grace by Which I Stand"
 1992: The Word: Recapturing the Imagination – Michael Card (background)
 1993: New Young Messiah – various artists; "I Know That My Redeemer Liveth"
 1993: Coram Deo II – various artists; "Rejoice in Jesus" and "In Spirit and in Truth"
 1994: Saviour: Story of God's Passion for His People (with Larnelle Harris, Twila Paris, Wayne Watson, Wintley Phipps)
 1995: Inspirational Homecoming: A Tribute to the Gaither Legacy – various artists; "I Can See (On the Emmaus Road)"
 1995: Christmas Carols of the Young Messiah – various artists; "Joy to the World"
 1995: Hymns & Voices – various artists; "All Creatures of Our God and King" and "Old Rugged Cross"
 1995: Wedding Album – various artists; "Household of Faith"
 1996: Live Worship – Promise Keepers – Promise Keepers "A Mighty Fortress Is Our God"
 1997: Unveiled Hope – Michael Card; duet with Michael Card on "Holy, Holy, Holy"
 1997: Israel – various artists; "Canta Canta"
 1998: Experiencing God – various artists; "Calvary Is the Sea"
 1998: Almighty God – various artists; "Seekers of Your Heart"
 1999: If My People Pray – various artists; "I Am in God's Hands"
 1999: 32 Great Hymns of the Faith – various artists; "What Wondrous Love Is This"
 1999: Listen to Our Hearts, Vol.2 – various artists; "Say the Name"
 1999: White Heart - Demos, Interviews, and Lost Songs – White Heart; "You Loved Me Still the Same" & "If Only For One Night"
 1999: Adore Him – various artists; (Narrator)
 1999: McCaughey Septuplets: Sweet Dreams – various artists; "Goodnight Emily"
 2000: Word & Song Collection – various artists; (Narrator)
 2002: Hallelujah!: The Very Best of the Brooklyn Tabernacle Choir
 2002: Scribbling in the Sand - Michael Card; duet with Michael Card on "Immanuuel"
 2009: Gaither Vocal Band Reunion Vol 1 – "He Came Down to My Level", "No Other Name But Jesus", and "A Few Good Men"
 2009: Gaither Vocal Band Reunion Vol 2 – "Passin' the Faith Along" and "Find Us Faithful"
 2010: My Cry Ascends: New Parish Psalms (various artists, Gregory Wilbur, composer)
 2011: A Man Like Me – Wes Hampton; duet on "It Is Well with My Soul"
 2012: Larnelle: Live In Nashville!; Three Tenors: "Kings of the Earth" and "It Is Well" with Larnelle Harris and Steve Amerson
 2014: Out on a Limb – Wes Hampton; trio with Hampton and David Phelps on "Echo of You"
 2015: Psalms Hymns and Spiritual Songs – Michael O'Brien; duet with Michael O'Brien on "For All the Saints"
 2015: Free – Paul Turner; duet with Paul Turner on "Jesus My Strength"

Video
1986: God and God Alone VHS: Live In Concert 
1991: Hide 'Em In Your Heart: 13 Bible Memory Music Videos for Children of All Ages 
1992: Hymns: A Portrait of Christ (Sparrow)
1992: What My Parents Did Right
1994: Live! The Young Messiah
1996: Live Worship – Promise Keepers VHS – Promise Keepers "A Mighty Fortress Is Our God"
1998: The Faithful
2002: Steve Green: Life Story – The Journey to a Life Message
2008: A Journey of Faith (Live)
2009: Gaither Vocal Band Reunion Vol 1 and 2
2012: Larnelle: Live In Nashville! DVD; Three Tenors – "Kings of the Earth" and "It Is Well" with Larnelle Harris and Steve Amerson
2016: Saviour: The Story of God's Passion for His People Recorded live at Gateway Church

External links

References

1956 births
Living people
20th-century American singers
20th-century Christians
21st-century American singers
21st-century Christians
American gospel singers
American male singer-songwriters
American tenors
Christian music songwriters
Musicians from Portland, Oregon
Promise Keepers
Singer-songwriters from Oregon
Spanish-language singers of the United States
White Heart members
20th-century American male singers
21st-century American male singers